The Undying Darkness is the fifth studio album by German metalcore band Caliban.

Track listing

Credits 
Writing, performance and production credits are adapted from the album's liner notes.

Personnel

Caliban 
 Andy Dörner – vocals
 Marc Görtz – lead guitar
 Denis Schmidt – rhythm guitar, vocals
 Marco Schaller – bass, backing vocals
 Patrick Grün – drums

Additional musicians 
 Benjamin Richter – keyboard, sampling
 Bony Fertigmensch – additional bass
 "Mille" Petrozza – additional vocals on "Moment of Clarity"
 Tanja Keilen – additional vocals on "Army of Me"
 Sky Hoff (Machinemade God) – additional guitar on "Nothing Is Forever" and "Army of Me"
 Ben Fink – background vocals on "It's Our Burden to Bleed" and "No More 2nd Chances"
 Marcel Hilgenstock – background vocals on "It's Our Burden to Bleed" and "No More 2nd Chances"
 Björn Esser – background vocals on "It's Our Burden to Bleed" and "No More 2nd Chances"
 Flo Velten (ex-Machinemade God) – background vocals on "It's Our Burden to Bleed" and "No More 2nd Chances"
 Pete – background vocals on "It's Our Burden to Bleed" and "No More 2nd Chances"

Production 
 Anders Fridén – production, recording
 Andy Sneap (Sabbat) – mixing, mastering

Artwork and design 
 Mike D'Antonio – artwork, layout

Studios 
 Principal Studios, Senden, Germany – production, recording
 Backstage Production, Ripley, England – mixing, mastering

Charts

References

External links 
 

2006 albums
Caliban (band) albums